César Ernesto Ritter Burga (born in Lima, Peru on 31 August 1979) is a Peruvian actor. He is known for playing "Lalo" Chávez in Mil Oficios, Lorenzo Wilmer Vargas Vargas con harto de Sanchez in Asi Es La Vida, Nicolás Bingley/Rita in Rita y Yo and the recurrent role of Manolo López in the television series Al Fondo Hay Sitio.

Biography 
He studied at the Alexander von Humboldt German school in Lima.

Ritter was involved in casting and directing a number of television series, such as One thousand jobs and Plop and Flynn.

Filmography

Awards & Nominations
Ritter has been nominated for several Premios Luces with the latest being in 2021.

References 

Peruvian male film actors
Peruvian male stage actors
Peruvian male television actors
Male actors from Lima
1979 births
Living people
20th-century Peruvian male actors
21st-century Peruvian male actors